Aknalich (or Aknalitch, ; formerly, Aygherlich) is a village in the Armavir Province of Armenia. The village is situated on a lake, after which it is named, to the east of Metsamor.

Aknalich village is the site of the only Yazidi temple in Armenia. A new temple in the village known as Quba Mere Diwane, opened in September 2019. It is the world's largest Yazidi Temple. The 25 meter tall temple was funded by Armenian-born, Russia-based Yezidi businessman Mirza Sloian.

Gallery

See also
Armavir Province
Quba Mere Diwane
List of Yazidi holy places
Yazidis in Armenia

References

World Gazetteer: Armenia  – World-Gazetteer.com

Populated places in Armavir Province
Yazidi holy places
Yazidi populated places in Armenia